Sincerely, Kentrell is the third studio album by American rapper YoungBoy Never Broke Again. It was released on September 24, 2021, through Never Broke Again and Atlantic Records. It follows his second album, Top (2020). Unlike his previous projects, the album contains no guest appearances. A deluxe edition, named Sincerely, Kentrell > (pronounced "better"), was released four days later on September 28, 2021, and contains two additional songs.

Sincerely, Kentrell was supported by five singles: "Toxic Punk", "White Teeth", "Nevada", "Life Support" and "On My Side". The album received generally positive reviews from music critics and was a commercial success, debuting at number one on the US Billboard 200 chart, earning 137,000 album-equivalent units in its first week.

Singles
"Toxic Punk" was released on February 4, 2021, as the album's lead single. "White Teeth" was released on May 14, 2021, as the second single. The third single, "Nevada", was released on July 7, 2021. The fourth single, "Life Support", was released on September 10, 2021. "On My Side" was released on September 17, 2021, as the fifth and final single.

Critical reception

Sincerely, Kentrell received generally positive reviews from music critics. David Aaron Brake from HipHopDX states that "like much of YoungBoy’s albums Sincerely, Kentrell is less a polished product and more the stream-of-consciousness thoughts of YoungBoy at the moment." He also cites that "YoungBoy raps through a thick Louisiana drawl, the battle between betrayal and loyalty takes center stage." He concludes his review by stating "Sincerely, Kentrell is YoungBoy at his most vulnerable and vengeful, worn down by his own paranoia, some justified and some fabricated." Alphonse Pierre from Pitchfork states that "He has blurred the lines between his rap persona and lived reality, which makes it an uncomfortable, but sometimes remarkable listen." He further mentions that "Though the album’s quality may vary from song to song, it all adds up to a startling glimpse of a larger-than-life figure whose tragic shadow extends over everything he touches." Concluding his review, he explains that "While it carries the same flaws as his previous work, the latest album from the Baton Rouge rapper provides a clear portrait of a tragic figure who often blurs the lines between fact and fiction."

Will Dukes from Rolling Stone writes that "his style, a whimsical mix of Young Thug and fellow New Orleanian Little Wayne is heavy on melody, which he fuses with some rough-and-tumble grit." He further mentions that "if these are the proverbial scars YoungBoy Never Broke Again ’s chosen to reveal to us, they’re from battles, thankfully, he’s already won." Concluding his review, he writes that "the Baton Rouge, Louisiana-based rapper's third album is full of conviction and bruised passion."

Commercial performance
Sincerely, Kentrell debuted at number one on the US Billboard 200 chart, earning 137,000 album-equivalent units (including 10,000 in pure sales) in its first week, according to MRC Data. This became YoungBoy's fourth US number one debut on the chart. The album also accumulated a total of 186.29 million on-demand streams of the album's 23 tracks. In addition, YoungBoy joined Tupac and Lil Wayne as the third rapper to receive a number one album while incarcerated. In its second week, the album dropped to number four, earning 71,000 units.

Track listing

Personnel
Credits adapted from Tidal.

Musicians
 YoungBoy Never Broke Again – vocals (all tracks)
 Vadebeatz - Guitar, perucssion, piano (16)

Technical
 Jason "Cheese" Goldberg – mastering (1-23), mixing (1-15, 20-23), recording (2-13, 15, 20-23), assistant recording (1, 17-19)
 Spencer Dennis – recording (14)
 Mark Dorflinger – recording (16-19), mixing (17-19)

Charts

Weekly charts

Year-end charts

Certifications

References

2021 albums
Atlantic Records albums
YoungBoy Never Broke Again albums